Mark Harmon is an American record producer, songwriter, and bassist, best known for his work with the rock group the 77s.

Harmon and 77s lead singer Michael Roe collaborated on the instrumental releases, DayDream and Orbis. Roe and Harmon also teamed up under the moniker 7&7iS to release their Fun with Sound album in 2004.

Harmon also currently performs with Jimmy Pailer & the Prophets, as well as being a member of Mind(X).

7&7iS Discography
 More Miserable Than You'll Ever Be, 1989, collector's edition box set
 More Miserable Than You'll Ever Be, 1990, album
 Fun with Sound, 2004, album

Instrumental albums with Michael Roe
 Daydream, 1999, album, original release (re-released in 2002)
 Orbis, 2002, album

References

External links
 The 77s
 The Strawmen
 Jimmy Pailer
 Mind(X)

Living people
Place of birth missing (living people)
Year of birth missing (living people)
American bass guitarists
American performers of Christian music
American record producers
Guitarists from California
The 77s members